The Diocese of Caledonia is a diocese of the Ecclesiastical Province of British Columbia and the Yukon of the Anglican Church of Canada.

Early missionary leaders who served in this diocese include William Ridley and James Benjamin McCullagh.

In 1977 the diocese published The Nishga Liturgy for Nisga'a Anglicans.

Bishops of Caledonia

Deans of Caledonia
The Dean of Caledonia is also usually Rector of St Andrew's Cathedral, Prince Rupert.
1929–1945: James B. Gibson (1st Dean) Bishop of Caledonia, 1945 
1945–: Basil S. Prockter (interesting archival note from Crockford's Clerical directory suggests that Bishop Gibson continued as Dean after his election, and that Basil Prockter was never listed as anything but "Canon", though he was the rector of the parish)
1956–1959: Albert Edward Hendy
1959–1963: George Tweddale Pattison
1964–1970: Ernest Geoffrey Flagg
1979–1985: Robert Gary Paterson
1986–1993: Michael John Wimmer
1994–1997: Glen Raymond Burgomaster
1998–1999: [Vacant]
2000–2002: Hugo T. Jackson
2002–2003: Acting Dean - Peter Davison
2004–2008: Rob Sweet 
2009: [Vacant]
2010–2011: James Barlow
2011–2017: Jason Haggstrom
2018–present: Stephen Paul Williams (installed as Rector 17 June 2018)

References

Caledonia
Prince Rupert, British Columbia
Christianity in British Columbia
Anglican Province of British Columbia and Yukon